61P/Shajn–Schaldach is a periodic comet in the Solar System with a current orbital period of 7.49 years.

It was discovered on 18 September 1949 on a photographic plate by Pelageja F. Shajn at the Simeiz Observatory, Crimea, part of the Crimean Astrophysical Observatory. It was also discovered independently two days later by Robert D. Schaldach at the Lowell Observatory in Arizona, US, also on a photographic plate. Shajn then found evidence of the comet on earlier photographs taken on August 28 and September 4.

The first computations of the comet's orbit gave a perihelion date of between December 1949 and October 1950 with a periodicity of 7.76 years. After taking into account perturbations due a close approach to Jupiter the next perihelion was calculated to be on 15 March 1957 but in that year it was never found. It was also not discovered on its next predicted appearance in 1964. The most likely explanation for the two failures was the comet's faintness.

It was, however, re-located on 29 September 1971 by Charles T. Kowal of the Department of Astrophysics, California Institute of Technology, US, using the 122 cm Palomar Schmidt telescope, who estimated its brightness at a faint magnitude of 16. Other astronomers confirmed the sighting.

The comet was successfully observed on its subsequent returns in 1979, 1986, 1993, 2001 and 2008.

See also
 List of numbered comets

References

Periodic comets
0061
Comets in 2015
19490918